Dmitry Gladkyi (19 October 1911 – 27 October 1959) was a Moldavian SSR politician.

Biography 
Dmitry Spiridonovich Gladkyi was born in 1911 and died in 1959. He died when he was only 48.

Dmitry Gladkyi was a First Secretary of the Moldavian Communist Party (October 25, 1952 - February 7, 1954).

External links 
 Generals. dk - Zinovii Serdiuk
 Сердюк Зиновий Тимофеевич
 O biografie cronologică

Bibliography
 
 *** - Enciclopedia sovietică moldovenească (Chişinău, 1970–1977)

 

1911 births
1959 deaths
People from Kirovohrad Oblast
People from Yelisavetgradsky Uyezd
Communist Party of the Soviet Union members
Ukrainian communists
First Secretaries of the Communist Party of Moldavia
Fourth convocation members of the Supreme Soviet of the Soviet Union
Fifth convocation members of the Supreme Soviet of the Soviet Union
Members of the Supreme Soviet of the Moldavian Soviet Socialist Republic
Soviet military personnel of World War II
Recipients of the Order of Lenin